William George Burrill (born April 17, 1934) was sixth bishop of the Episcopal Diocese of Rochester, serving from 1984 to 1999.

Early life and education
Burrill was born in 1934 in New York City, the son of the Reverend Gerald Francis Burrill, later Bishop of Chicago, and Janet Burrill. He studied at the at Sewanee: The University of the South and later at the General Theological Seminary. He also has a Master of Divinity and a Doctor of Divinity from General.

Ordination
Burrill was ordained deacon on June 20, 1959, by Bishop Charles L. Street, Suffragan of Chicago and a priest later that year. He served as the Episcopal chaplain at the University of California between 1962 and 1973. He was also vicar of St Martin's Church in Davis, California and later became rector of the same church. In 1982 he was appointed Archdeacon of Northern California.

Bishop
Burrill was elected Coadjutor Bishop of Rochester on November 5, 1983, after 18 ballots during a special convention which took place in Christ Church in Corning, New York. He was consecrated on April 26, 1984, by Presiding Bishop John Allin in the Cathedral of the Sacred Heart in Rochester, New York. He succeeded as diocesan bishop on July 1, 1984, upon the retirement of Robert R. Spears Jr. He remained in Rochester till 1999 after which he served as Assistant Bishop of Arizona. He is also  Bishop-in-Residence at All Saints' Church in Phoenix, Arizona.

Family
Burrill married Kay Clough in 1960 and together had four children. After his wife died in 2010, he married Marilyn Carol Usher in 2013.

References

External links 
Rochester Taps Burrill as Bishop-coadjutor

Living people
1934 births
Religious leaders from New York City
Sewanee: The University of the South alumni
General Theological Seminary alumni
Episcopal bishops of Rochester